is a former Japanese football player.

Playing career
Chishima was born in Kawagoe on May 11, 1981. He joined J2 League club Urawa Reds from youth team in 2000. On April 12, he debuted as substitute midfielder from the 55th minute against Kawasaki Frontale in J.League Cup. Although the club was promoted to J1 League from 2001, he could hardly play in the match until 2001. From 2002, he played several matches every season until 2004. However he could not play at all in the match from 2005. In June 2006, he moved to newly was promoted to J2 club, Ehime FC and played many matches as substitute midfielder. However he injured his left knee in May 2007 and he could not play until late 2008. He played as substitute midfielder in 2009 and retired end of 2009 season.

Club statistics

References

External links

1981 births
Living people
Association football people from Saitama Prefecture
Japanese footballers
J1 League players
J2 League players
Urawa Red Diamonds players
Ehime FC players
Association football midfielders